WHC Metalurg is a women's handball club from Skopje, North Macedonia. The team currently competes in the Macedonian women's First League of Handball.

History
The club was established in 1964 under the name MIK and played in the amateur handball league of SR Macedonia. In the seasons 1967 ,1968 and 1970 MIK became winner of the handball league of SR Macedonia. In 1973 the club was renamed to RK Skopje. Finally in 1975, RK Skopje achieved their greatest success, participation in the First Yugoslav Handball League. In 1978, RK Skopje won the Yugoslav Cup for the territory of SR Macedonia. From then until the dissolution of former Yugoslavia, RK Skopje played in the Second Yugoslav Handball League.

After the independence of Macedonia in 1991, RK Skopje competed in the Macedonian women's First League of Handball, and the club played in the EHF Women's Cup Winners' Cup in 1994 and in the Women's EHF Challenge Cup the following year.

In the season 2007/08 the club got a strong sponsor, and under the name ŽRK Metalurg Skopje, unbeaten entered in the Macedonian women's First League of Handball. In the 2009/10 season ŽRK Metalurg Skopje won the Macedonian Championship and the Macedonian Cup without losing a point. The following season the club again won the league title and domestic cup. In the 2011–12 season, they had their best showing in Europe by making it to the Last 16 of the Women's EHF Cup Winners' Cup. They followed that up with their third straight domestic double crown.

After long domination of WHC Vardar in the season 2018-19 WHC Metalurg Skopje made a big come back winning the championship of Macedonia again. They have reached the final of the Macedonian cup, but lost the final game against WHC Kumanovo.

In the 2021–2022 season, after 9 years Metalurg managed to get in to National Cup Final 4. Competing against stronger opponents with more experienced a better players Metalurg won the Cup title for the 6th time. In the 1/2 finals they had to face defending Cup winners and Champions Kumanovo. After being two down 10-12 at the half time they managed to make a turnover and win in the end with 25-21 surprising the Champions. In the final match they had to meet the strong team of glorious Glorche Petrov team -the one with the most trophies in the country. Although Gjorche Petrov were the favorites, Metalurg played brilliantly in the final game. They made 4 goals difference at the half time 14-10 and keeping it wisely in the second half finishing 30-27. The most valuable player of the final match was 15 year old super talent Eva Mladenovska with 9 goals adding to the 10 from the semifinals.

Arena 
Avtokomanda (Macedonian: "Автокоманда") is an indoor sports arena located in Skopje, owned and used by Metalurg handball club. It's a small arena with its own fitness center and canteen restaurant. It has a capacity of 2500 people, 2000 seated and 500 standing.

Accomplishments 

 Championship of Macedonia 
Winners  (8): 1967, 1968,1970, 1985, 2010, 2011, 2012, 2019

 Macedonian Cup 
Winners  (6):  1978,2010, 2011, 2012, 2013, 2022

 Challenge Cup
Semi-Finalist  (1): 2009/10
 WRHL Women
Finalist  (1) :  2011/12
Third place  (1) :  2009/10

European record

Team

Current squad
Squad for the 2021–22 season

Technical staff
  Head Coach: Julijana Damchevska
  Assistant Coach: Krsto Petrushevski
  Physiotherapist: Filip Jovanovski
  Director: Filip Hristov

References

External links 
Official Website 
EHF Profile 
Macedonian Handball Federation 
Women's Regional Handball League 

Handball clubs in North Macedonia
Handball clubs established in 1964
Sport in Skopje